Miss Universe Colombia 2020 was the first edition of the Miss Universe Colombia pageant, under its new organization. The competition was held on 16 November 2020 in Barranquilla.

Catriona Gray crowned Laura Olascuaga of Bolívar at the end of the event. She later represented Colombia at Miss Universe 2020.

Results

Placements 

§ Voted into Top 16 by viewers.

Pageant

Background 
Initially, Miss Colombia held the Colombian license for Miss Universe, and had selected María Fernanda Aristizábal as the Colombian representative for Miss Universe 2020 through Miss Colombia 2019. However, in June 2020, the license was purchased by Natalie Ackermann, who announced that she would be forming her own organization to select a new Colombian representative for Miss Universe 2020, which meant that Aristizábal would not be competing.

Selection of contestants 
From September to October 2020, castings were held in Bogotá, Bucaramanga, Neiva, Cali, Medellín, and Barranquilla for prospective contestants to audition for a spot in the competition. The official contestants who were selected to compete were released in batches throughout October 2020, following each casting. In order to represent a department, contestants had to either be from the department or have a parent from the department.

Josseidy Escalona was originally to represent Providencia and Santa Catalina Islands, while Valeria Ayos was to represent San Andrés. Escalona resigned from the competition amidst controversy regarding one department receiving two representatives; Ayos was to represent the full department of San Andrés, Providencia and Santa Catalina, but later tested positive for COVID-19 and had to resign from the competition. Luisa Fernanda Urango, the original representative for Córdoba Department, was disqualified after lying about her age; she was replaced by Carolina Guerra. Due to controversy within Amazonas Department over a woman not from the department being their representative, Dayana Cárdenas, the former representative of Amazonas, was changed to represent the city of Valledupar instead. Cárdenas later had her sash changed "Cabildo Encanto Amazonas", referring to the indigenous cabildo of El Encanto in Amazonas Department, which had expressed support for Cárdenas amidst the controversy.

Judges 

 Natalia Barulích – American model and singer
 Catriona Gray – Miss Universe 2018 from the Philippines
 Pilar Guzmán Lizarazo – Public relations officer
 Luz Elena Restrepo – Miss Colombia 1967 from Atlántico
 Amalin de Hasbún – Fashion designer

Contestants 
30 delegates have been selected:

Notes

References 

Beauty pageants in Colombia
2020 beauty pageants